The 2015 Cronulla-Sutherland Sharks season is the 49th in the club's history. Coached by Shane Flanagan and captained by Paul Gallen, they competed in the NRL's 2015 Telstra Premiership. Starting the season as the previous season's wooden spooners, the Sharks finished the regular season in 6th place to reach the finals, winning their first play-off match but losing their second to eventual premiers North Queensland Cowboys and being knocked out of contention.

Ladder

Results

 Round 1 - Cronulla Sharks vs Canberra Raiders (20 - 24)
  Tries: Anthony Tupou, Sosaia Feki, Ricky Leutele

 Round 2 - Cronulla Sharks vs Brisbane Broncos (2 - 10)
  Tries: No Tries

 Round 3 - Melbourne Storm vs Cronulla Sharks (36 - 18)
  Tries: Jeff Robson, Valentine Holmes, Andrew Fifita

 Round 4 - Cronulla Sharks vs Gold Coast Titans (22 - 24)
  Tries: Valentine Holmes (2), Michael Ennis

 Round 5 - Sydney Roosters vs Cronulla Sharks (12 - 20)
  Tries: Jack Bird (2), Valentine Holmes, Luke Lewis

 Round 6 - Cronulla Sharks vs Newcastle Knights (22 - 6)
  Tries: Jack Bird, Luke Lewis, Ben Barba, Chris Heighington

 Round 7 - Cronulla Sharks vs South Sydney Rabbitohs  (18 - 10)
  Tries: Michael Gordon, Luke Lewis, Jayson Bukuya

 Round 8 - Penrith Panthers vs Cronulla Sharks (26 - 18)
  Tries: Sosaia Feki, Ricky Leutele, Valentine Holmes

 Round 9 - Cronulla Sharks vs New Zealand Warriors (16 - 20)
  Tries: Luke Lewis, Andrew Fifita

 Round 10 - Gold Coast Titans vs Cronulla Sharks (22 - 23)
  Tries: Valentine Holmes (2), Luke Lewis, Jack Bird
  Field Goal: Valentine Holmes

 Round 12 - St George Illawarra Dragons vs Cronulla Sharks (42 - 6)
  Tries: Valentine Holmes

 Round 13 - Cronulla Sharks vs Sydney Roosters (10 - 4)
  Tries: Luke Lewis

 Round 15 - Newcastle Knights vs Cronulla Sharks (28 - 30)
  Tries: Jack Bird (2), Valentine Holmes, Luke Lewis, Ben Barba

 Round 16 - North Queensland Cowboys vs Cronulla Sharks (18 - 24)
  Tries: Luke Lewis, Sam Tagataese, Andrew Fifita, Ricky Leutele

 Round 17 - Manly Sea Eagles vs Cronulla Sharks (28 - 16)
  Tries: Andrew Fifita (2), Sosaia Feki

 Round 18 - Cronulla Sharks vs St George Illawarra Dragons (28 - 8)
  Tries: Sosaia Feki, Luke Lewis, Valentine Holmes, Andrew Fifita, Ben Barba

 Round 19 - Canberra Raiders vs Cronulla Sharks (20 - 21)
  Tries: Valentine Holmes, Ricky Leutele, Andrew Fifita
  Field Goal: Valentine Holmes

 Round 20 - Canterbury Bulldogs vs Cronulla Sharks (16 - 18)
  Tries: Michael Gordon, Paul Gallen, Valentine Holmes

 Round 21 - New Zealand Warriors vs Cronulla Sharks (14 - 18)
  Tries: Valentine Holmes (2), Ricky Leutele

 Round 22 - Cronulla Sharks vs North Queensland Cowboys (30 - 18)
  Tries: Ricky Leutele, Jack Bird, Michael Gordon, Gerard Beale, Wade Graham

 Round 23 - Cronulla Sharks vs Melbourne Storm (2 - 30)
  Tries: No Tries

 Round 24 - Cronulla Sharks vs Wests Tigers (40 - 18)
  Tries: Valentine Holmes (2), Luke Lewis, Sosaia Feki, Michael Ennis, Wade Graham, Michael Gordon

 Round 25 - Parramatta Eels vs Cronulla Sharks (28 - 35)
  Tries: Sosaia Feki (2), Ricky Leutele, Luke Lewis, Jayson Bukuya, Michael Ennis
  Field Goal: Valentine Holmes

 Round 26 - Cronulla Sharks vs Manly Sea Eagles (12 - 14)
  Tries: Wade Graham, Gerard Beale

 Week 1 Finals - Cronulla Sharks vs South Sydney Rabbitohs (28 - 12)
  Tries: Jack Bird, Wade Graham, Anthony Tupou, Sam Tagataese

 Week 2 Finals - North Queensland Cowboys vs Cronulla Sharks (39 - 0)
  Tries: No Tries

References

Cronulla-Sutherland Sharks seasons
Cron